Tevekli can refer to:

 Tevekli, Bayat
 Tevekli, Ergani